Ceredigion is a county in Mid Wales.

Ceredigion may also refer to:

 Kingdom of Ceredigion, a medieval kingdom in this area
 Ceredigion (UK Parliament constituency)
 Ceredigion (Senedd constituency)
 Ceredigion (journal), an annual local history journal in Ceredigion